The 2009–10 season was Sheffield United's third year in the Football League Championship after being relegated from the Premier League in 2007.

Kit
Sheffield United's kit manufacturers became Macron. Their shirt sponsor continues as VisitMalta.com.

Events
 1 September 2009 – Paddy Kenny is banned for 9 months after failing his drug test.
 2 October 2009 – Jordan Robertson is sentenced for 32 months after causing death by a car crash, forcing his loan spell at Bury to be cut short.
 6 November 2009 – Paddy Kenny signs new contract until the summer of 2011.
 20 November 2009 – Trevor Birch is appointed as Chief Executive.

League

Sheffield United played their first game of the season in a 0–0 draw against former Premier League side Middlesbrough. Then the Blades beat Watford 2–0 with Ched Evans getting his debut goal. Leicester City held United to a 1–1 draw. They then beat Reading 3–1. This was followed by a thrilling 2–2 draw against West Bromwich Albion with David Cotterill scoring a late penalty. This was followed by a 1–0 win at Derby County with Matthew Kilgallon getting a last minute winner. United suffered their first league defeat of the season against Coventry City, they bounced back in the Steel City Derby which they won 3–2. The Blades suffered another defeat against Swansea City. The Blades started October with a draw against Doncaster Rovers, with Richard Cresswell getting his first goal for the blades. The next two games saw two loses against Scunthorpe United and Blackpool. The Blades continued their losing streak against Cardiff City. A 1–0 defeat at home to Newcastle United, this was followed with a draw against Barnsley. The following game they beat Peterborough United. United got a late win against Bristol City, with Darius Henderson getting his first hat-trick of his career. James Harper scored the only goal in a win over Plymouth Argyle. The Blades were then held to draw with Nottingham Forest. Sheffield then beat Crystal Palace 2–0, with Lee Williamson getting his first goal in a Blade shirt and Quinn got his second of the season. Queens Park Rangers held the Blades to a 1–1 draw. Sheffield then suffer their first defeat since 2 November against Leicester City this was quickly followed by a win over Preston North End.

Their first game of 2010 saw the Blades beat Middlesbrough 1–0 at Bramall Lane. This was followed up by a 3–0 home win against Reading. The Blades were then beaten 3–1 away at West Bromwich Albion.

FA Cup
In the third round Sheffield United held Championship rivals Queens Park Rangers to a 1–1 draw, resulting in a replay to take place. The Blades won the replay 3–2 at Loftus Road. Premier League Bolton Wanderers knocked out the Blades in the fourth round, beating them 2–0 at the Reebok Stadium.

League Cup
The first round saw a shock 2–1 home defeat against League Two Port Vale.

Players

First-team squad
Squad at end of season

Out on loan

Left club during season

Squad statistics

|-
|colspan="14"|Players who left before the end of the season:

|}

Disciplinary record

Events

Summer transfers in

Summer transfers out
 * Indicates the player joined the club after being released.

Loans in
 ** Indicates that the player returned before the return date.

Loans out

January transfers in

January transfers out

Fixtures and results

Championship

FA Cup

League Cup

Summer friendlies and Malta tour
Sheffield United are due to play three friendly matches in July all away as well as tour of Malta. The Friendlies are:

 10 July 2010: Mansfield Town F.C.
 12–17 July: Malta Tour
 20 July 2010: Burton Albion F.C.
 24 July 2010: Rotherham United F.C.

References

Notes

Sheffield United
Sheffield United F.C. seasons